The 4th constituency of Charente-Maritime (French: Quatrième circonscription de la Charente-Maritime) is one of five electoral districts in the department of Charente-Maritime, each of which returns one deputy to the French National Assembly in elections using the two-round system, with a run-off if no candidate receives more than 50% of the vote in the first round.

Description
The constituency is made up of 11 whole (pre-2015) cantons – those of Archiac, Cozes, Gémozac, Jonzac, Mirambeau, Montendre, Montguyon, Montlieu-la-Garde, Pons, Royan-Est, and Saint-Genis-de-Saintonge – plus two communes (Colombiers and La Jard) belonging to a twelfth: that of Saintes-Est.

At the time of the 1999 census (which was the basis for the most recent redrawing of constituency boundaries, carried out in 2010) the 4th constituency had a total population of 101,987.

Deputies

Election results

2022

 
 
 
 
 
 
 
|-
| colspan="8" bgcolor="#E9E9E9"|
|-

2017

2012

|- style="background-color:#E9E9E9;text-align:center;"
! colspan="2" rowspan="2" style="text-align:left;" | Candidate
! rowspan="2" colspan="2" style="text-align:left;" | Party
! colspan="2" | 1st round
! colspan="2" | 2nd round
|- style="background-color:#E9E9E9;text-align:center;"
! width="75" | Votes
! width="30" | %
! width="75" | Votes
! width="30" | %
|-
| style="background-color:" |
| style="text-align:left;" | Dominique Bussereau
| style="text-align:left;" | Union for a Popular Movement
| UMP
| 
| 40.01%
| 
| 52.15%
|-
| style="background-color:" |
| style="text-align:left;" | Fabienne Dugas-Raveneau
| style="text-align:left;" | Socialist Party
| PS
| 
| 35.41%
| 
| 47.85%
|-
| style="background-color:" |
| style="text-align:left;" | Tony Lambert
| style="text-align:left;" | Front National
| FN
| 
| 13.57%
| colspan="2" style="text-align:left;" |
|-
| style="background-color:" |
| style="text-align:left;" | Jean-Yves Boiffier
| style="text-align:left;" | Left Front
| FG
| 
| 4.23%
| colspan="2" style="text-align:left;" |
|-
| style="background-color:" |
| style="text-align:left;" | Jean-Luc Guerbois
| style="text-align:left;" | Europe Ecology – The Greens
| EELV
| 
| 2.43%
| colspan="2" style="text-align:left;" |
|-
| style="background-color:" |
| style="text-align:left;" | Valérie Verduzier
| style="text-align:left;" | Centrist
| CEN
| 
| 1.55%
| colspan="2" style="text-align:left;" |
|-
| style="background-color:" |
| style="text-align:left;" | Laure Serra
| style="text-align:left;" | Miscellaneous Right
| DVD
| 
| 1.02%
| colspan="2" style="text-align:left;" |
|-
| style="background-color:" |
| style="text-align:left;" | Martine Gantner
| style="text-align:left;" | Miscellaneous Right
| DVD
| 
| 0.74%
| colspan="2" style="text-align:left;" |
|-
| style="background-color:" |
| style="text-align:left;" | Valérie Baraud
| style="text-align:left;" | Far Left
| EXG
| 
| 0.68%
| colspan="2" style="text-align:left;" |
|-
| style="background-color:" |
| style="text-align:left;" | Stéphane Hays
| style="text-align:left;" | Other
| AUT
| 
| 0.36%
| colspan="2" style="text-align:left;" |
|-
| colspan="8" style="background-color:#E9E9E9;"|
|- style="font-weight:bold"
| colspan="4" style="text-align:left;" | Total
| 
| 100%
| 
| 100%
|-
| colspan="8" style="background-color:#E9E9E9;"|
|-
| colspan="4" style="text-align:left;" | Registered voters
| 
| style="background-color:#E9E9E9;"|
| 
| style="background-color:#E9E9E9;"|
|-
| colspan="4" style="text-align:left;" | Blank/Void ballots
| 
| 1.00%
| 
| 1.84%
|-
| colspan="4" style="text-align:left;" | Turnout
| 
| 59.38%
| 
| 60.33%
|-
| colspan="4" style="text-align:left;" | Abstentions
| 
| 40.62%
| 
| 39.67%
|-
| colspan="8" style="background-color:#E9E9E9;"|
|- style="font-weight:bold"
| colspan="6" style="text-align:left;" | Result
| colspan="2" style="background-color:" | UMP HOLD
|}

2007

2002

 
 
 
 
 
 
 
 
|-
| colspan="8" bgcolor="#E9E9E9"|
|-

1997

References

Sources
 Notes and portraits of the French MPs under the Fifth Republic, French National Assembly
 2012 French legislative elections: Charente-Maritime's 4th constituency (first round and run-off), Minister of the Interior

4